Olla is a genus of fungi within the Hyaloscyphaceae family. The genus contains 12 species.

References

External links
Olla at Index Fungorum

Hyaloscyphaceae